The Space Systems Laboratory (SSL) is in the Department of Aeronautics and Astronautics at the Massachusetts Institute of Technology in Cambridge, MA. Its mission is to develop the technology and systems analysis associated with small spacecraft, precision optical systems, and International Space Station technology research and development.

History
A previous Space Systems Laboratory (Maryland) was founded at MIT in 1976, by faculty members Renee Miller and J.W. Mar. In 1990, lab director Dr. Dave Akin moved the lab to the University of Maryland.

The current Space Systems Laboratory was founded in 1995 at MIT. It begun as a part of the Space Engineering Research Center (SERC).

The laboratory has a practice of Conceive-Design-Implement-Operate (CDIO), working to provide students hands-on learning as a part of their coursework. One of the laboratory's flagship research testbeds, SPHERES, began in 1999 as an undergraduate senior design project.

People

The current directors of the SSL are Rebecca Masterson and Prof. Richard Linares. The principal research scientist is Alvar Saenz-Otero. Former director Prof. Dave Miller is now faculty for the laboratory. Long time staff include Marilyn Good and Paul Bauer.

Faculty members include: 
Dr. Daniel Hastings
Dr. Jeffrey Hoffman, former NASA Astronaut
Dr. Olivier de Weck
Dr. Kerri Cahoy
Dr. Sara Seager, a MacArthur Fellow
Dr. Richard Binzel

Projects

OSIRIS-REx's REXIS
ROAM: Relative Operations for Autonomous Maneuvers
ReCon
iSAT
Advanced Telescope Concepts

ISS Research
SPHERES
Zero Robotics, a competition for middle and high school students on the International Space Station
VERTIGO (Visual Estimation and Relative Tracking for Inspection of Generic Objects) 
RINGS (Resonant Inductive Near-field Generation System)
MACE II

CubeSats
MicroMAS (Micro-sized Microwave Atmospheric Satellite)
MicroMAS-2
ExoplanetSat
inflated antenna

Space Shuttle Research
Middeck 0-Gravity Dynamics Experiment (MODE), STS-48
Middeck Active Control Experiment (MACE), STS-67
Dynamic Load Sensor (DLS), STS-62

Partners
MIT Lincoln Laboratory
Aerospace
NASA
NASA's Jet Propulsion Laboratory
DARPA
University of Maryland
Space Systems Laboratory (Maryland)
Aurora Flight Sciences
Draper Laboratory

Associated NASA Programs

Small Satellite Technology Initiative (SSTI)
New Millennium Program
International Space Station Technology Testbed Program

Alumni

While the students go off to a wide variety of careers, many SSL graduates have gone to NASA's Jet Propulsion Laboratory. In particular, several have been on the Entry, Descent, and Landing (EDL) teams of Mars missions. Allen Chen and Dr. Swati Mohan announced the touchdown of the Mars Science Laboratory and Mars 2020 rovers, respectively.

The laboratory also has strong ties to the United States Air Force, with several students coming from the USAF Academy. Dr. Miller worked with the Academy to create fully funded graduate scholarships to MIT for graduates of the its FalconSAT program.

In the news

A 2014 paper from PhD candidate Sydney Do and several additional SSL graduate students received world-wide attention for its assessment that astronauts wouldn't be able to survive in the Mars One project's design more than a few couple of the months. The analysis was performed based on publicly available information of the design.

References

Space research
Massachusetts Institute of Technology